The following is a list of accolades of American actress and singer Emma Roberts.

FilmOut San Diego LGBT Film Festival

FilmOut Festival Awards

MTV Movie Awards 
The MTV Movie & TV Awards (formerly known as the MTV Movie Awards) is a film and television awards show presented annually on MTV. The nominees are decided by producers and executives at MTV. Roberts has received one award.

Maui Film Festival

Nickelodeon Australian Kids' Choice Awards 
The Australian Nickelodeon Kids' Choice Awards was an annual awards show that awarded entertainers with a blimp trophy, as voted by kids. Roberts has received three nominations.

Nickelodeon Kids' Choice Awards 
The Nickelodeon Kids' Choice Awards (also known as the KCAs or Kids' Choice) is an annual American children's awards ceremony show that is produced by Nickelodeon. Roberts has received two nominations.

Nickelodeon UK Kids' Choice Awards 
The Nickelodeon Kids' Choice Awards UK, also known as the KCAs, is an annual awards show, similar to the American and Australian versions. Roberts has received one nomination.

People's Choice Awards 
The E! People's Choice Awards, formerly known as the People's Choice Awards, is an American awards show, recognizing people in entertainment, voted online by the general public and fans. Roberts has received one nomination.

Radio Disney Music Awards 
The Radio Disney Music Awards (RDMA) is an annual awards show operated and governed by Radio Disney, an American radio network. Roberts has received two nominations.

ShoWest Convention

Teen Choice Awards 
The Teen Choice Awards is an annual awards show that airs on the Fox Broadcasting Company television network. Roberts has received one award from 11 nominations.

Women's Image Network Awards

Young Artist Awards 
The Young Artist Award (originally known as the Youth in Film Award) is an accolade presented by the Young Artist Association, a non-profit organization founded in 1978 to honor excellence of youth performers, and to provide scholarships for young artists who may be physically challenged or financially unstable. Roberts has received one award from ten nominations.

Young Hollywood Awards 
The Young Hollywood Awards was an award presented annually which honors the year's biggest achievements in pop music, movies, sports, television, fashion and more, as voted on by teenagers aged 13–19 and young adults. Roberts has received one nomination.

Notes

References

External links 

 
 

Lists of awards received by American actor